Sir James Christopher Jenkins, KCB, KC (Hon) (born 20 May 1939) is a British lawyer and retired parliamentary draftsman.

Born in 1939, Jenkins attended Lewes County Grammar School and Magdalen College, Oxford, graduating with a first-class BA in jurisprudence in 1961. He worked at Slaughter and May between 1962 and 1967, and was admitted a solicitor in February 1965. He joined the Office of the Parliamentary Counsel in 1967, and was promoted to be a Parliamentary Counsel in 1978, the Second Parliamentary Counsel in 1991 and then First Parliamentary Counsel in 1994, serving until retirement in 1999.  Jenkins was appointed a Companion of the Order of the Bath in the 1987 Birthday Honours, and promoted to Knight Commander in the 1999 Birthday Honours. He was made an honorary Queen's Counsel in 1994.

References 

1939 births
Living people
English solicitors
Knights Commander of the Order of the Bath
Honorary King's Counsel
20th-century King's Counsel
21st-century King's Counsel
Alumni of Magdalen College, Oxford
First Parliamentary Counsel